Costa Rica competed at the 1992 Summer Paralympics in Barcelona, Spain. 2 competitors from Costa Rica won no medals and so did not place in the medal table.

See also 
 Costa Rica at the Paralympics
 Costa Rica at the 1992 Summer Olympics

References 

Costa Rica at the Paralympics
Nations at the 1992 Summer Paralympics